Radon is a former commune in the Orne department in north-western France. On 1 January 2016, it was merged into the new commune of Écouves. It is around 7 km north of Alençon.

See also
Communes of the Orne department
Parc naturel régional Normandie-Maine

References

Former communes of Orne